A burn mask is a fabric or sheet which helps to prevent skin burns from creating a visible scar.

References

Medical masks
Burns